Pachappa Hill is a summit in the Temescal Mountains within the city of Riverside in Riverside County, California.

History 
Riverside historians have proposed that the original seven square league (approximately ) Rancho Jurupa land grant was significantly smaller than the area eventually recognized by the United States. They argue that Pachappa Hill, the southeast marker of the Rancho Jurupa, was originally the name of another hill, today known as Mount Rubidoux, and that one of the early owners of Rancho Jurupa reassigned the name Pachappa to the current day Pachappa Hill in order to expand the property of the Rancho.

See also 
Mount Rubidoux
Rancho Jurupa

References 

Temescal Mountains
Mountains of Riverside County, California
Geography of Riverside, California
Mountains of Southern California
History of Riverside, California